Sir Roger Vernon Scruton  (27 February 194412 January 2020) was an English philosopher and writer who specialised in aesthetics and political philosophy, particularly in the furtherance of traditionalist conservative views.

Editor from 1982 to 2001 of The Salisbury Review, a conservative political journal, Scruton wrote over 50 books on philosophy, art, music, politics, literature, culture, sexuality, and religion; he also wrote novels and two operas. His most notable publications include The Meaning of Conservatism (1980), Sexual Desire (1986), The Aesthetics of Music (1997), and How to Be a Conservative (2014). He was a regular contributor to the popular media, including The Times, The Spectator, and the New Statesman.

Scruton explained that he embraced conservatism after witnessing the May 1968 student protests in France. From 1971 to 1992 he was a lecturer and professor of aesthetics at Birkbeck College, London, after which he held several part-time academic positions, including in the United States.  In the 1980s he helped to establish underground academic networks in Soviet-controlled Eastern Europe, for which he was awarded the Czech Republic's Medal of Merit (First Class) by President Václav Havel in 1998. Scruton was knighted in the 2016 Birthday Honours for "services to philosophy, teaching and public education".

Early life

Family background
Roger Scruton was born in Buslingthorpe, Lincolnshire, to John "Jack" Scruton, a teacher from Manchester, and his wife, Beryl Claris Scruton (née Haynes), and was raised with his two sisters in High Wycombe and Marlow. The Scruton surname had been acquired relatively recently. Jack's father's birth certificate showed him as Matthew Lowe, after Matthew's mother, Margaret Lowe (Scruton's great grandmother); the document made no mention of a father. However, Margaret Lowe had decided, for reasons unknown, to raise her son as Matthew Scruton instead. Scruton wondered whether she had been employed at the former Scruton Hall in Scruton, Yorkshire, and whether that was where her child had been conceived.

Jack was raised in a back-to-back on Upper Cyrus Street, Ancoats, an inner-city area of Manchester, and won a scholarship to Manchester High School, a grammar school. Scruton told The Guardian that Jack hated the upper classes and loved the countryside, while Beryl entertained "blue-rinsed friends" and was fond of romantic fiction. He described his mother as "cherishing an ideal of gentlemanly conduct and social distinction that ... [his] father set out with considerable relish to destroy".

Education

The Scrutons lived in a pebbledashed semi-detached house in Hammersley Lane, High Wycombe. Although his parents had been brought up as Christians, they regarded themselves as humanists, so home was a "religion-free zone". Scruton's, indeed the whole family's, relationship with his father was difficult. He wrote in Gentle Regrets (2005): "Friends come and go, hobbies and holidays dapple the soulscape like fleeting sunlight in a summer wind, and the hunger for affection is cut off at every point by the fear of judgement."

After passing his 11-plus, he attended the Royal Grammar School High Wycombe from 1954 to 1962, leaving with three A-levels, in pure and applied mathematics, physics, and chemistry, which he passed with distinction. The results won him an open scholarship in natural sciences to Jesus College, Cambridge, as well as a state scholarship. When he told his family he had won a place at Cambridge, his father stopped speaking to him. Scruton writes that he was expelled from the school shortly afterwards, when during one of Scruton's plays the headmaster found the school stage on fire and a half-naked girl putting out the flames. 

Having intended to study natural sciences at Cambridge, where he felt "although socially estranged (like virtually every grammar-school boy), spiritually at home", Scruton switched on the first day to moral sciences (philosophy); his supervisor was A. C. Ewing. He graduated with a double first in 1965, then spent time overseas, some of it teaching at the University of Pau and Pays de l'Adour in Pau, France, where he met his first wife, Danielle Laffitte. He also lived in Rome. His mother died around this time; she had been diagnosed with breast cancer and had undergone a mastectomy just before he went to Cambridge.

In 1967 he began studying for his PhD at Jesus College and then became a research fellow at Peterhouse, Cambridge (1969–1971), where he lived with Laffitte when she was not in France. It was while visiting her during the May 1968 student protests in France that Scruton first embraced conservatism. He was in the Latin Quarter in Paris, watching students overturn cars, smash windows and tear up cobblestones, and for the first time in his life "felt a surge of political anger":

 I suddenly realised I was on the other side. What I saw was an unruly mob of self-indulgent middle-class hooligans. When I asked my friends what they wanted, what were they trying to achieve, all I got back was this ludicrous Marxist gobbledegook. I was disgusted by it, and thought there must be a way back to the defence of western civilization against these things. That's when I became a conservative. I knew I wanted to conserve things rather than pull them down.

1970s–1980s

Birkbeck, first marriage

Cambridge awarded Scruton his PhD in January 1973 for a thesis titled "Art and imagination, a study in the philosophy of mind", supervised by Michael Tanner and Elizabeth Anscombe. The thesis was the basis of his first book, Art and Imagination (1974). From 1971 he taught philosophy at Birkbeck College, London, which specializes in adult education and holds its classes in the evening. Meanwhile, Laffitte taught French at Putney High School, and the couple lived together in a Harley Street apartment previously occupied by Delia Smith. They married in September 1973 at the Brompton Oratory, a Catholic church in Knightsbridge, and divorced in 1979. Scruton's second book, The Aesthetics of Architecture, was published that year.

Scruton said he was the only conservative at Birkbeck, except for the woman who served meals in the Senior Common Room. Working there left Scruton's days free, so he used the time to study law at the Inns of Court School of Law (1974–1976) and was called to the Bar in 1978; he never practised because he was unable to take a year off work to complete a pupillage.

In 1974, along with Hugh Fraser, Jonathan Aitken and John Casey, he became a founding member of the Conservative Philosophy Group dining club, which aimed to develop an intellectual basis for conservatism. The historian Hugh Thomas and the philosopher Anthony Quinton attended meetings, as did Margaret Thatcher before she became prime minister. She reportedly said during one meeting in 1975: "The other side have got an ideology they can test their policies against. We must have one as well."

According to Scruton, his academic career at Birkbeck was blighted by his conservatism, particularly by his third book, The Meaning of Conservatism (1980), and later by his editorship of the conservative Salisbury Review. He told The Guardian that his colleagues at Birkbeck vilified him over the book. The Marxist philosopher G. A. Cohen of University College London reportedly refused to teach a seminar with Scruton, although they later became friends. He continued teaching at Birkbeck until 1992, first as a lecturer, by 1980 as reader, then as professor of aesthetics.

The Salisbury Review

In 1982 Scruton became founding editor of The Salisbury Review, a journal championing traditional conservatism in opposition to Thatcherism, which he edited until 2001. The Review was set up by a group of Tories known as the Salisbury Group — founded in 1978 by Diana Spearman and Robert Gascoyne-Cecil — with the involvement of the Peterhouse Right. The latter were conservatives associated with the Cambridge college, including Maurice Cowling, David Watkin and the mathematician Adrian Mathias. As of 1983 it had a circulation of under 1,000; according to Martin Walker, the circulation understated the journal's influence.

Scruton wrote that editing The Salisbury Review effectively ended his academic career in the United Kingdom. The magazine sought to provide an intellectual basis for conservatism, and was highly critical of key issues of the period, including the Campaign for Nuclear Disarmament, egalitarianism, feminism, foreign aid, multiculturalism and modernism. In the first edition, he wrote: "It is necessary to establish a conservative dominance in intellectual life, not because this is the quickest or most certain way to political influence, but because in the long run, it is the only way to create a climate of opinion favourable to the conservative cause." To begin with, Scruton had to write most of the articles himself, using pseudonyms: "I had to make it look as though there was something there in order that  there should be something there!" He believes that the Review "helped a new generation of conservative intellectuals to emerge. At last it was possible to be a conservative and also to the left of something, to say 'Of course, the Salisbury Review is beyond the pale; but ...'"

In 1984 the Review published a controversial article by Ray Honeyford, a headmaster in Bradford, questioning the benefits of multicultural education. Honeyford was forced to retire because of the article and had to live for a time under police protection. The British Association for the Advancement of Science accused the Review of scientific racism, and the University of Glasgow philosophy department boycotted a talk Scruton had been invited to deliver to its philosophy society. Scruton believed that the incidents made his position as a university professor untenable, although he also maintained that "it was worth sacrificing your chances of becoming a fellow of the British Academy, a vice-chancellor or an emeritus professor for the sheer relief of uttering the truth." (Scruton was in fact elected a fellow of the British Academy in 2008.) In 2002 he described the effect of the editorship on his life:

 It cost me many thousand hours of unpaid labour, a hideous character assassination in Private Eye, three lawsuits, two interrogations, one expulsion, the loss of a university career in Britain, unendingly contemptuous reviews, Tory suspicion, and the hatred of decent liberals everywhere. And it was worth it.

Writing
The 1980s established Scruton as a prolific writer. Thirteen of his non-fiction works appeared between 1980 and 1989, as did his first novel, Fortnight's Anger (1981). The most contentious publication was Thinkers of the New Left (1985), a collection of his essays from The Salisbury Review, which criticized 14 prominent intellectuals, including E. P. Thompson, Michel Foucault and Jean-Paul Sartre. According to The Guardian, the book was remaindered after being greeted with "derision and outrage". Scruton said he became very depressed by the criticism. In 1987 he founded his own publisher, The Claridge Press, which he sold to the Continuum International Publishing Group in 2002.

From 1983 to 1986 he wrote a weekly column for The Times. Topics included music, wine and motorbike repair, but others were contentious. The features editor, Peter Stothard, said that there was no one he had ever commissioned "whose articles had provoked more rage". Scruton made fun of anti-racism and the peace movement, and his support for Margaret Thatcher while she was prime minister was regarded, he wrote, as an "act of betrayal for a university teacher". His first column, "Why politicians are all against real education", argued that universities were destroying education "by making it relevant": "Replace pure by applied mathematics, logic by computer programming, architecture by engineering, history by sociology. The result will be a new generation of well-informed philistines, whose charmlessness will undo every advantage which their learning might otherwise have conferred."

Activism in Central Europe

From 1979 to 1989, Scruton was an active supporter of dissidents in Czechoslovakia under Communist Party rule, forging links between the country's dissident academics and their counterparts in Western universities. As part of the Jan Hus Educational Foundation, he and other academics visited Prague and Brno, now in the Czech Republic, in support of an underground education network started by the Czech dissident Julius Tomin, smuggling in books, organizing lectures, and eventually arranging for students to study for a Cambridge external degree in theology (the only faculty that responded to the request for help). There were structured courses and samizdat translations, books were printed, and people sat exams in a cellar with papers smuggled out through the diplomatic bag.

Scruton was detained in 1985 in Brno before being expelled from the country. The Czech dissident Bronislava Müllerová watched him walk across the border with Austria: "There was this broad empty space between the two border posts, absolutely empty, not a single human being in sight except for one soldier, and across that broad empty space trudged an English philosopher, Roger Scruton, with his little bag into Austria." On 17 June that year, he was placed on the Index of Undesirable Persons. He wrote that he had also been followed during visits to Poland and Hungary.

For his work in supporting dissidents, Scruton was awarded the First of June Prize in 1993 by the Czech city of Plzeň, and in 1998 he was awarded the Czech Republic's Medal of Merit (First Class) by President Václav Havel. In 2019 the Polish government awarded him the Grand Cross of the Order of Merit of the Republic of Poland. Scruton was strongly critical of figures in the West — in particular Eric Hobsbawm — who "chose to exonerate" the crimes and atrocities of former communist regimes. His experience of dissident intellectual life in 1980s Communist Prague is recorded in fictional form in his novel Notes from Underground (2014). He wrote in 2019 that "despite the appeal of the Poles, Hungarians, Romanians and many more, it is the shy, cynical Czechs to whom I lost my heart and from whom I have never retrieved it".

1990s–2000s

Farm purchase, second marriage

Scruton took a year's sabbatical from Birkbeck in 1990 and spent it working in Brno in the Czech Republic. That year he registered Central European Consulting, established to offer business advice in post-communist Central Europe. He sold his apartment in Notting Hill Gate, and when he returned to England, he rented a cottage in Stanton Fitzwarren, Swindon, from the Moonies, and an apartment in the Albany building on Piccadilly, London, from the Conservative MP Alan Clark (it had been Clark's servants' quarters).

From 1992 to 1995, he lived in Boston, Massachusetts, teaching an elementary philosophy course and a graduate course on the philosophy of music for one semester a year, as professor of philosophy at Boston University. Two of his books grew out of these courses: Modern Philosophy: A Survey (1994) and The Aesthetics of Music (1997). In 1993 he bought Sunday Hill Farm in Brinkworth, Wiltshire—35 acres later increased to 100, and a 250-year-old farmhouse — where he lived after returning from the United States. He called it "Scrutopia".

While in Boston, Scruton had flown back to England every weekend to indulge his passion for fox hunting, and it was during a meet of the Beaufort Hunt that he met Sophie Jeffreys, an architectural historian. They announced their engagement in The Times in September 1996 (Jeffreys was described as "the youngest daughter of the late Lord Jeffreys and of Annie-Lou Lady Jeffreys"), married later that year and set up home on Sunday Hill Farm. Their two children were born in 1998 and 2000. In 1999 they created Horsell's Farm Enterprises, a PR firm that included Japan Tobacco International and Somerfield Stores as clients. Scruton and his publisher were successfully sued for libel that year by the Pet Shop Boys for suggesting, in his book An Intelligent Person's Guide To Modern Culture (1998), that their songs were in large part the work of sound engineers; the group settled for undisclosed damages.

Tobacco company funding
Scruton was criticized in 2002 for having written articles about smoking without disclosing that he was receiving a regular fee from Japan Tobacco International (JTI, formerly R. J. Reynolds). In 1999 he and his wife — as part of their consultancy work for Horsell's Farm Enterprises — began producing a quarterly briefing paper, The Risk of Freedom Briefing (1999–2007), about the state's control of risk. Distributed to journalists, the paper included discussions about drugs, alcohol and tobacco, and was sponsored by JTI. Scruton wrote several articles in defence of smoking around this time, including one in 1998 for The Times, three for the Wall Street Journal (two in 1998 and one in 2000), one for City Journal in 2001, and a 65-page pamphlet for the Institute of Economic Affairs, WHO, What, and Why: Trans-national Government, Legitimacy and the World Health Organisation (2000). The latter criticized the World Health Organization's campaign against smoking, arguing that transnational bodies should not seek to influence domestic legislation because they are not answerable to the electorate.

The Guardian reported in 2002 that Scruton had been writing about these issues while failing to disclose that he was receiving £54,000 a year from JTI. The payments came to light when a September 2001 email from the Scrutons to JTI was leaked to The Guardian. Signed by Scruton's wife, the email asked the company to increase their £4,500 monthly fee to £5,500, in exchange for which Scruton would "aim to place an article every two months" in the Wall Street Journal, Times, Telegraph, Spectator, Financial Times, Economist, Independent, or New Statesman. Scruton, who said the email had been stolen, replied that he had never concealed his connection with JTI. In response to The Guardian article, the Financial Times ended his contract as a columnist, The Wall Street Journal suspended his contributions, and the Institute for Economic Affairs said it would introduce an author-declaration policy. Chatto & Windus withdrew from negotiations for a book, and Birkbeck removed his visiting-professor privileges.

Move to the United States

The tobacco controversy damaged Scruton's consultancy business in England. In part because of that, and because the Hunting Act 2004 had banned fox hunting in England and Wales, the Scrutons considered moving to the United States permanently, and in 2004 they purchased Montpelier, an 18th-century plantation house near Sperryville, Virginia. Scruton set up a company, Montpelier Strategy LLC, to promote the house as a venue for weddings and similar events. The couple lived there while retaining Sunday Hill Farm in England, but decided in 2009 against a permanent move to the United States and sold the house. Scruton held two part-time academic positions during this period. From 2005 to 2009 he was research professor at the Institute for the Psychological Sciences in Arlington, Virginia, a graduate school of Divine Mercy University; and in 2009 he worked at the American Enterprise Institute in Washington, D.C., where he wrote his book Green Philosophy (2011).

Wine, opera
From 2001 to 2009 Scruton wrote a wine column for the New Statesman, and contributed to The World of Fine Wine and Questions of Taste: The Philosophy of Wine (2007), with his essay "The Philosophy of Wine". His book I Drink Therefore I Am: A Philosopher's Guide to Wine (2009) in part comprises material from his New Statesman column. 

Scruton, who was largely self-taught as a composer, composed two operas setting his own libretti. The first is a one-act chamber piece, The Minister (1994), and the second a two-act opera, Violet (2005). The latter, based on the life of the British harpsichordist Violet Gordon-Woodhouse, was performed twice at the Guildhall School of Music in London in 2005.

2010s

Academic posts, knighthood
The Scrutons returned from the United States to live at Sunday Hill Farm in Wiltshire, and Scruton took an unpaid research professorship at the University of Buckingham. In January 2010 he began an unpaid three-year visiting professorship at the University of Oxford to teach graduate classes on aesthetics, and was made a senior research fellow of Blackfriars Hall, Oxford. In 2010 he delivered the Scottish Gifford Lectures at the University of St Andrews on "The Face of God", and from 2011 until 2014 he held a quarter-time professorial fellowship at St Andrews in moral philosophy.

Two novels appeared during this period: Notes from Underground (2014) is based on his experiences in Czechoslovakia, and The Disappeared (2015) deals with child trafficking in a Yorkshire town. Scruton was knighted in the 2016 Birthday Honours for "services to philosophy, teaching and public education". He sat on the editorial board of the British Journal of Aesthetics and on the board of visitors of Ralston College, a new college proposed in Savannah, Georgia, and was a senior fellow of the Ethics and Public Policy Center, a conservative think tank in Washington, D.C.

Building Better, Building Beautiful Commission
In November 2018, Communities Secretary James Brokenshire appointed Scruton as unpaid chair of the British government's Building Better, Building Beautiful Commission, established to promote better home design. Labour and Liberal Democrat MPs objected because of remarks Scruton had made years earlier: he had described "Islamophobia" as a "propaganda word", homosexuality as "not normal", lesbianism as an attempt to find "committed love that [a woman] can't get from men any more", and date rape as not a distinct crime. He had also made allegedly conspiratorial remarks about the Jewish businessman George Soros.

In April 2019, an interview of Scruton by George Eaton appeared in the New Statesman. To publicise it, Eaton posted edited extracts from the interview on Twitter, of Scruton talking about Soros, Chinese people and Islam, among other topics, and referred to them as "a series of outrageous remarks". Immediately after the interview and Eaton's posts went online, Scruton began to be criticised by various politicians and journalists; hours later, Brokenshire dismissed Scruton from the Commission. When Scruton's dismissal was announced, Eaton posted a photograph of himself on Instagram drinking from a bottle of champagne, captioned "The feeling when you get right-wing racist and homophobe Roger Scruton sacked as a Tory government adviser". The next day, Scruton wrote in The Spectator, "We in Britain are entering a dangerous social condition in which the direct expression of opinions that conflict – or merely seem to conflict – with a narrow set of orthodoxies is instantly punished by a band of self-appointed vigilantes." On 12 April, Eaton apologised for his tweets and the Instagram post but otherwise stood by the interview, but would not release a full recording.

On 25 April, Scruton's colleague Douglas Murray, who had obtained a full recording of the interview, published details of it in The Spectator, and wrote that Eaton had conducted a "hit job". The audio suggested that both the tweets and Eaton's article had omitted relevant context. For example, Scruton had said: "Anybody who doesn't think that there's a Soros empire in Hungary has not observed the facts", but the article omitted: "it's not necessarily an empire of Jews; that's such nonsense." Of the Chinese, Eaton tweeted that Scruton had said: "Each Chinese person is a kind of replica of the next one and that is a very frightening thing." Eaton's article included more words: "They're creating robots out of their own people ... each Chinese person is a kind of replica ...." The transcript showed the full sentence: "In a sense they're creating robots out of their own people by so constraining what can be done," which suggested the topic was the Chinese Communist Party. In response, the New Statesman published the full transcript.

On 2 May, the New Statesman readers' editor, Peter Wilby, wrote that Eaton's online comments suggested that he had "approached the interview as a political activist, not as a journalist". Two months later, the New Statesman officially apologised. Several days later, Brokenshire also apologised to Scruton. Scruton was re-appointed a week later as co-chair of the commission.

Philosophical and political views

Aesthetics
According to Paul Guyer, in A History of Modern Aesthetics: The Twentieth Century,  "After Wollheim, the most significant British aesthetician has been Roger Scruton." Scruton was trained in analytic philosophy, although he was drawn to other traditions. "I remain struck by the thin and withered countenance that philosophy quickly assumes," he wrote in 2012, "when it wanders away from art and literature, and I cannot open a journal like Mind or The Philosophical Review without experiencing an immediate sinking of the heart, like opening a door into a morgue." He specialised in aesthetics throughout his career. From 1971 to 1992 he taught aesthetics at Birkbeck College. His PhD thesis formed the basis of his first book, Art and Imagination (1974), in which he argued that "what demarcates aesthetic interest from other sorts is that it involves the appreciation of something for its own sake". He subsequently published The Aesthetics of Architecture (1979), The Aesthetic Understanding (1983), The Aesthetics of Music (1997), and Beauty (2010). In 2008 a two-day conference was held at Durham University to assess his impact in the field, and in 2012 a collection of essays, Scruton's Aesthetics, edited by Andy Hamilton and Nick Zangwill, was published by Palgrave Macmillan.

In an Intelligence Squared debate in March 2009, Scruton (seconding historian David Starkey) proposed the motion: "Britain has become indifferent to beauty", and held an image of Botticelli's The Birth of Venus next to one of the supermodel Kate Moss. Later that year he wrote and presented a BBC Two documentary, Why Beauty Matters, in which he argued that beauty should be restored to its traditional position in art, architecture and music. He wrote that he had received "more than 500 e-mails from viewers, all but one saying, 'Thank Heavens someone is saying what needs to be said.'" In 2018 he argued that a belief in God makes for more beautiful architecture: "Who can doubt, on visiting Venice, that this abundant flower of aesthetic endeavour was rooted in faith and watered by penitential tears? Surely, if we want to build settlements today we should heed the lesson of Venice. We should begin always with an act of consecration, since we thereby put down the real roots of a community."

Arguments for conservatism

Best known for his writing in support of conservatism, Scruton's intellectual heroes were Edmund Burke, Samuel Taylor Coleridge, Fyodor Dostoevsky, Georg Wilhelm Friedrich Hegel, John Ruskin, and T. S. Eliot. His third book, The Meaning of Conservatism (1980) — which he called "a somewhat Hegelian defence of Tory values in the face of their betrayal by the free marketeers" — was responsible, he said, for blighting his academic career. He supported Margaret Thatcher, while remaining sceptical of her view of the market as a solution to everything, but after the Falklands War, he realized that she "recognised that the self-identity of the country was at stake, and that its revival was a political task".

Scruton wrote in Gentle Regrets (2005) that he found several of Burke's arguments in Reflections on the Revolution in France (1790) persuasive. Although Burke was writing about revolution, not socialism, Scruton was persuaded that, as he put it, the utopian promises of socialism are accompanied by an abstract vision of the mind that bears little relation to the way most people think. Burke also convinced him that there is no direction to history, no moral or spiritual progress; that people think collectively toward a common goal only during crises such as war, and that trying to organize society this way requires a real or imagined enemy; hence, Scruton wrote, the strident tone of socialist literature.

Scruton further argued, following Burke, that society is held together by authority and the rule of law, in the sense of the right to obedience, not by the imagined rights of citizens. Obedience, he wrote, is "the prime virtue of political beings, the disposition that makes it possible to govern them, and without which societies crumble into 'the dust and powder of individuality'". Real freedom does not stand in conflict with obedience, but is its other side. He was also persuaded by Burke's arguments about the social contract, including that most parties to the contract are either dead or not yet born. To forget this, he wrote — to throw away customs and institutions — is to "place the present members of society in a dictatorial dominance over those who went before, and those who came after them".

Beliefs that appear to be examples of prejudice may be useful and important, he wrote: "our most necessary beliefs may be both unjustified and unjustifiable, from our own perspective, and the attempt to justify them will merely lead to their loss." A prejudice in favour of modesty in women and chivalry in men, for example, may aid the stability of sexual relationships and the raising of children, although these are not offered as reasons in support of the prejudice. It may therefore be easy to show the prejudice as irrational, but there will be a loss nonetheless if it is discarded. Scruton was critical of the contemporary feminist movement, while reserving praise for suffragists such as Mary Wollstonecraft. However, he praised Germaine Greer in 2016, saying that she had "cast an awful lot of light on our literary tradition" by showing the male as the dominant figure, and defended her against criticism for having used the word "sex" to describe the difference between men and women, rather than "gender", which Scruton called "politically correct".

Scruton considered that moral education should be "endarkening" as well as "enlightening", with "endarkening" being used as the inverse of "enlightening". "Endarkenment" is Scruton's way of describing the process of socialization through which certain behaviours and choices are closed off and forbidden to the subject, which he considers necessary to curb socially damaging impulses and behaviour:moral education cannot be … purely enlightened and enlightening … it cannot be simply a matter of teaching [people] to calculate the long term profit and the loss, while leaving .. desires to develop independently. It must involve an endarkened and endarkening component, by which [people] are taught precisely to cease [their] calculations, to regard certain paths as forbidden, as places where neither profit nor loss has authority.
In Arguments for Conservatism (2006), Scruton marked out the areas in which philosophical thinking is required if conservatism is to be intellectually persuasive. He argued that human beings are creatures of limited and local affections. Territorial loyalty is at the root of all forms of government where law and liberty reign supreme; every expansion of jurisdiction beyond the frontiers of the nation state leads to a decline in accountability.

He opposed elevating the "nation" above its people, which would threaten rather than facilitate citizenship and peace. "Conservatism and conservation" are two aspects of a single policy, that of husbanding resources, including the social capital embodied in laws, customs and institutions, and the material capital contained in the environment. He argued further that the law should not be used as a weapon to advance special interests. People impatient for reform — for example in the areas of euthanasia or abortion — are reluctant to accept what may be "glaringly obvious to others — that the law exists precisely to impede their ambitions".

The book defines post-modernism as the claim that there are no grounds for truth, objectivity, and meaning, and that conflicts between views are therefore nothing more than contests of power. Scruton argued that, while the West is required to judge other cultures in their own terms, Western culture is adversely judged as ethnocentric and racist. He wrote: "The very reasoning which sets out to destroy the ideas of objective truth and absolute value imposes political correctness as absolutely binding, and cultural relativism as objectively true."

Monarchy
Scruton was a supporter of constitutional monarchy arguing it is "the light above politics, which shines down on the human bustle from a calmer and more exalted sphere." In a 1991 column for the Los Angeles Times, he argued that monarchy helped create peace in Central Europe and "the loss of it that precipitated 70 years of conflict on the Continent."

Religion
Scruton was an Anglican. His book Our Church: A Personal History of the Church of England (2013) defended the relevance of the Church of England. He contends, following Immanuel Kant, that human beings have a transcendental dimension, a sacred core exhibited in their capacity for self-reflection. He argues that we are in an era of secularization without precedent in the history of the world; writers and artists such as Rainer Maria Rilke, T. S. Eliot, Edward Hopper and Arnold Schoenberg "devoted much energy to recuperating the experience of the sacred — but as a private rather than a public form of consciousness." Because these thinkers directed their art at the few, he writes, it has never appealed to the many.

On the matter of evidence of God's existence, Scruton said: "Rational argument can get us just so far…  It can help us to understand the real difference between a faith that commands us to forgive our enemies, and one that commands us to slaughter them. But the leap of faith itself — this placing of your life at God's service — is a leap over reason's edge. This does not make it irrational, any more than falling in love is irrational." However, despite claiming that belief alone is sufficiently rational, he advocated a form of the argument from beauty: he said that when we take the beauty in the natural world around us as a gift, we are able to openly understand God. The beauty speaks to us, he claims, and from it we can understand God's presence around us.

Totalitarianism
Scruton defined totalitarianism as the absence of any constraint on central authority, with every aspect of life the concern of government. Advocates of totalitarianism feed on resentment, Scruton argues, and having seized power they proceed to abolish institutions — such as the law, property, and religion — that create authorities: "To the resentful it is these institutions that are the cause of inequality, and therefore the cause of their humiliations and failures." He argues that revolutions are not conducted from below by the people, but from above, in the name of the people, by an aspiring elite. The importance of Newspeak in totalitarian societies, he writes, is that the power of language to describe reality is replaced by language whose purpose is to avoid encounters with realities. He agrees with Alain Besançon that the totalitarian society envisaged by George Orwell in Nineteen Eighty-Four (1949) can be only understood in theological terms, as a society founded on a transcendental negation. In accordance with T. S. Eliot, Scruton believes that true originality is only possible within a tradition, and that it is precisely in modern conditions — conditions of fragmentation, heresy, and unbelief — that the conservative project acquires its sense.

Sex
The philosopher of religion Christopher Hamilton described Scruton's Sexual Desire (1986) as "the most interesting and insightful philosophical account of sexual desire" produced within analytic philosophy. The book influenced subsequent discussions of sexual ethics. Martha Nussbaum credited Scruton in 1997 with having provided "the most interesting philosophical attempt as yet to work through the moral issues involved in our treatment of persons as sex partners".

According to Jonathan Dollimore, Scruton based a conservative sexual ethic on the Hegelian proposition that "the final end of every rational being is the building of the self", which involves recognizing the other as an end in itself. Scruton argues that the major feature of perversion is "sexual release that avoids or abolishes the other", which he sees as narcissistic and solipsistic. Nussbaum countered that Scruton did not apply his principle of otherness equally — for example, to sexual relationships between adults and children or between Protestants and Catholics. In an essay, "Sexual morality and the liberal consensus" (1990), Scruton wrote that homosexuality leads to the "de-sanctifying of the human body" because the body of the homosexual's lover belongs to the same category as his own. He further argued that gay people have no children and consequently no interest in creating a socially stable future. He therefore considered it justified to "instil in our children feelings of revulsion" towards homosexuality, and in 2007 he challenged the idea that gay people should have the right to adopt.  Scruton told The Guardian in 2010 that he would no longer defend the view that revulsion against homosexuality can be justified.

Other views

2014, Scruton stated that he supported English independence because he believed that it would uphold friendship between England, Scotland, Wales, and Northern Ireland, and because the English would have a say in all matters. In 2019, when asked if he believed in English independence, he told the New Statesman:

No, I don't think I've ever really favoured English independence. My view is that if the Scots want to be independent then we should aim for the same thing ... I don't think the Welsh want independence, the Northern Irish certainly don't. The Scottish desire for independence is, to some extent, a fabrication. They want to identify themselves as Scots but still ... enjoy the subsidy they get from being part of the kingdom. I can see there are Scottish nationalists who envision something more than that, but if that becomes a real political force then yeah, we should try for independence too. As it is, as you know, the Scots have two votes: they can vote for their own parliament and vote to put their people into our parliament, who come to our parliament with no interest in Scotland but an interest in bullying us.

Scruton strongly supported Brexit, because he believed that the European Union is a threat to the sovereignty of the United Kingdom and that Brexit will help retain national identity, which he saw as being under threat as a result of mass immigration, and because he opposed the Common Agricultural Policy.

Awards

For his work with the Jan Hus Educational Foundation in communist Czechoslovakia, Scruton was awarded the First of June Prize in 1993 by the Czech city of Plzeň. In 1998 Václav Havel, president of the Czech Republic, presented him with the Medal of Merit (First Class). In the UK, he was knighted in the 2016 Birthday Honours for "services to philosophy, teaching and public education". His family accompanied him to the ceremony, which was performed by Prince Charles at Buckingham Palace.

Polish President Andrzej Duda presented Scruton with the Grand Cross of the Order of Merit of the Republic of Poland in June 2019 "for supporting the democratic transformation in Poland". In November that year, the Senate of the Czech Parliament awarded him a Silver Medal for his work in support of Czech dissidents. The following month, during a ceremony in London, Hungarian Prime Minister Viktor Orbán presented him with the Hungarian Order of Merit, Commander's Cross with Star.

  1998: First Class of the Medal of Merit of the Czech Republic
  2015: Knight Bachelor
  2019: First Class of the Grand Cross of the Order of Merit of the Republic of Poland
  2019: Commander's Cross with Star of the Hungarian Order of Merit

Death
After learning in July 2019 that he had cancer, Scruton underwent treatment, including chemotherapy. He died on 12 January 2020 at the age of 75. The following day, the Prime Minister, Boris Johnson tweeted: "We have lost the greatest modern conservative thinker – who not only had the guts to say what he thought but said it beautifully." The Chancellor of the Exchequer, Sajid Javid, referred to Scruton's work behind the Iron Curtain: "From his support for freedom fighters in Eastern Europe to his immense intellectual contribution to conservatism in the West, he made a unique contribution to public life."

Mario Vargas Llosa, a winner of the Nobel Prize in Literature, wrote: "[Scruton] was one of the most educated people I have ever met. He could speak of music, literature, archeology, wine, philosophy, Greece, Rome, the Bible and a thousand subjects more than an expert, although he was not an expert on anything, because, in fact, he was a humanist in the classical style ... Scruton's departure leaves a dreadful void around us."

Conservative MEP Daniel Hannan called Scruton "the greatest conservative of our age", adding: "The country has lost a towering intellect. I have lost a wonderful friend." Robert Jenrick, the Secretary of State for Housing, Communities and Local Government, said that Scruton's work on "building more beautifully, submitted recently to my department, will proceed and stand part of his unusually rich legacy". The scholar and former politician Ayaan Hirsi Ali described him as a "dear and generous friend, who gave freely to those who sought advice and wisdom, and he expected little in return". Another friend and colleague, Douglas Murray, paid tribute to Scruton's personal kindness, calling him "one of the kindest, most encouraging, thoughtful, and generous people you could ever have known". Others who paid tribute to Scruton included education reformer Katharine Birbalsingh and cabinet minister Michael Gove who called Scruton "an intellectual giant, a brilliantly clear and compelling writer".

In an essay critical of Scruton's philosophy of aesthetics, "The Art of Madness and Mystery", published in Church Life (a journal of the University of Notre Dame's McGrath Institute) shortly after Scruton's death, Michael Shindler wrote that "like the Roman guard who would not abandon his post during the cataclysm of Pompeii, the late Roger Scruton stands in lonesome majesty as the artistic tradition's greatest defender athwart modernity’s aesthetic upheaval."

Scruton's funeral was celebrated on 24 January 2020 at Malmesbury Abbey, at the presence, among others, of several peers, Conservative politicians and the Prime Minister of Hungary Viktor Orbán. Following the funeral ceremony, which was presided by the Revd Oliver Stross, Scruton's remains were buried in the Abbey's churchyard.

Selected works 

Nonfiction
 Art And Imagination: A Study in the Philosophy of Mind (London: Routledge & Kegan Paul, 1974)
 The Aesthetics of Architecture (Princeton: Princeton University Press, 1979)
 The Meaning of Conservatism (1980)
 The Politics of Culture and Other Essays (Manchester: Carcanet Press, 1981)
 A Short History of Modern Philosophy (1982)
 A Dictionary of Political Thought (1982)
 The Aesthetic Understanding: Essays in the Philosophy of Art and Culture (Manchester: Carcanet Press, 1983)
 Kant (1982)
 Untimely Tracts (1985)
 Thinkers of the New Left (1985)
  (1986)
 Spinoza (1986)
 A Land Held Hostage: Lebanon and the West (1987)
 Conservative Thinkers: Essays from The Salisbury Review (1988)
 Philosopher on Dover Beach: Essays (Manchester: Carcanet Press, 1990)<ref>Warnock, Mary (24 June 1990). "Scrutonies on a darkling plain". The Observer, 51.</ref>
 Conservative Texts: An Anthology (ed.) (1992)
 Modern Philosophy: A Survey (London: Sinclair-Stevenson, 1994)
 The Classical Vernacular: Architectural Principles in an Age of Nihilism (1995)
 An Intelligent Person's Guide to Philosophy (1996); republished as Philosophy: Principles and Problems (2005)
 The Aesthetics of Music (1997)
 On Hunting (1998)
 An Intelligent Person's Guide to Modern Culture (1998); republished as Modern Culture (2005)
 Spinoza (1998)
 Animal Rights and Wrongs (2000)
 England: An Elegy (2001)
 The West and the Rest: Globalisation and the Terrorist Threat (2002)
 Death-Devoted Heart: Sex and the Sacred in Wagner's Tristan und Isolde (Oxford University Press, 2004)
 News From Somewhere: On Settling (2004)
 The Need for Nations (2004)
 Gentle Regrets: Thoughts from a Life (Continuum, 2005)
 A Political Philosophy: Arguments for Conservatism (2006)
 Immigration, Multiculturalism and the Need to Defend the Nation State (2006)
 Culture Counts: Faith and Feeling in a World Besieged (Encounter Books, 2007)
 Beauty (2009)
 I Drink Therefore I Am: A Philosopher's Guide to Wine (2009)
 Understanding Music (2009)
 The Uses of Pessimism: And the Danger of False Hope (2010)
 Liberty and Civilization: The Western Heritage (2010)
 Green Philosophy: How to Think Seriously About the Planet (2011); revised and republished as How to Think Seriously About the Planet: The Case for an Environmental Conservatism (2012)
 The Face of God: The Gifford Lectures (2012)
 Our Church: A Personal History of the Church of England (2012)
 The Soul of the World (2014)
 How to Be a Conservative (2014)
 Fools, Frauds and Firebrands: Thinkers of the New Left (2015)
 The Ring of Truth: The Wisdom of Wagner's Ring of the Nibelung (2016)
 Conversations with Roger Scruton (2016)
 Where We Are (2017)
 Confessions of a Heretic: Selected Essays (2017)
 On Human Nature (2017)
 Conservatism: An Invitation to the Great Tradition (2017)
 Music as an Art (2018)

Fiction
 Fortnight's Anger: a novel (1981)
 Francesca: a novel (1991)
 A Dove Descending and Other Stories (1991)
 Xanthippic Dialogues (1993)
 Perictione in Colophon: Reflections of the Aesthetic Way of Life (2000)
 Notes from Underground (2014)
 The Disappeared (2015)
 Souls in the Twilight: Stories of Loss (2018)

Opera
 The Minister (1994).
 Violet (2005)

Television
 Why Beauty Matters (BBC Two, 2009)

See also
 Animal rights#Roger Scruton
 Oikophobia#Political usage

Notes

 References 

 Further reading

 Roger Scruton's website
 Roger Scruton's articles at The Spectator Roger Scruton's articles at The New Criterion Roger Scruton's articles  at openDemocracy
 Roger Scruton's wine articles. New Statesman, October 2005 – August 2009
 The Salisbury Review
 The Gifford Lectures 2011–2012. University of St Andrews
 The Stanton Lectures 2011–2012. University of Cambridge
The True, the Good, and the Beautiful . Brigham Young University
Roger Scruton's entry at Who's WhoArticles
 Billings, Joshua (11 May 2009). "A Joy Forever?". Oxonian Review (review of Scruton's Beauty).
 Kimball, Roger (17 February 1991). "An Assault on Mush". The New York Times.
 Kimball, Roger (June 1994). "Saving the Appearances: Roger Scruton on Philosophy". The New Criterion.
 Scruton, Roger (22 May 1983). "The Case against Feminism". The Observer, 27.
 Morrison, Blake (29 May 1983). "In Defence of Feminism". The Observer, 27.
 Scruton, Roger (5 June 1983). "Feminism: Letter to the editor". The Observer, 27.
 Scruton, Roger (25 November 1990). "Her Virtue Was Thatcher's Downfall", Los Angeles Times.
 Scruton, Roger (17 December 2012). "The Great Swindle" . Aeon Magazine''.
 

1944 births
2020 deaths
20th-century English philosophers
21st-century English philosophers
Academics of Birkbeck, University of London
Alumni of Jesus College, Cambridge
American Enterprise Institute
Analytic philosophers
Anglican philosophers
Articles containing video clips
Boston University faculty
Critics of animal rights
Critics of atheism
Critics of postmodernism
Conservatism in the United Kingdom
Deaths from cancer in England
English political philosophers
English Anglicans
Fellows of Peterhouse, Cambridge
Fellows of the British Academy
Fellows of the Royal Society of Literature
Knights Bachelor
Male critics of feminism
Members of the European Academy of Sciences and Arts
Members of the Inner Temple
People educated at the Royal Grammar School, High Wycombe
People from West Lindsey District
Philosophers of art
Philosophers of sexuality
Architectural theoreticians
Recipients of Medal of Merit (Czech Republic)
Spinoza scholars
The American Spectator people
The Spectator people
Wine critics
Ethics and Public Policy Center
Philosophers of music